Albert Farley Heard (October4, 1833March26, 1890) was an American banker and diplomat who was the second-ranked member on the founding committee of The Hongkong and Shanghai Banking Corporation (HSBC). He was the son of Elizabeth Ann Farley and George Washington Heard, brother of Augustine Heard. After graduating from Yale University, he went to China to assist his uncle in business and ultimately succeed him in heading the management of his trading firm, Augustine Heard & Co.

Career in China 
Heard was born on October4, 1833 in Ipswich, Massachusetts and graduated from Yale University in 1853, having submitted his thesis on the late medieval philosopher and reformer John Huss. Thereafter he travelled to Canton (now known as Guangzhou), China to join the family firm of Augustine Heard & Co. becoming a partner in 1856 and later managing partner. During his tenure as head of the firm, Heard fought off serious competition in the Yangtze River steamer trade from rival American firm Russell & Company.

Along with the three other Shanghai businessmen, R.C. Antrobus, James Whittal and Henry Dent, in 1860 Heard purchased 40 mu (about ) of land within the Shanghai Race Club for cricket and other sports. He also later served as the Russian consul general in the city, and as the representative of the Chinese government in Russia. In 1887, he published The Russian church and Russian dissent, comprising orthodoxy, dissent, and erratic sects, covering multiple aspects of Russian orthodoxy. In 1857, during the Second Opium War, Heard traveled from Shanghai to Hong Kong aboard the steamer Antelope. Outside of business, Heard is known to have owned a collection of pictures by the early photographer Felice Beato.

Return to the US 
Heard left China in May 1873, having first conveyed a parcel of land at the corner of Aberdeen and Staunton Streets in Hong Kong to his "protected" Chinese woman, Lam Kew-fong. Back in America, Heard married Mary Allen Livingstone. He died on March26 1890 in Washington, D.C.

Notes

References 

1833 births
1890 deaths
People from Ipswich, Massachusetts
History of foreign trade in China
Yale University alumni
HSBC people
American expatriates in China